Dowpar Nazari (also Romanized as Dowpar Naz̧arī; also known as Depar, Depar Naz̧arī, and Doparnaz̧arī) is a village in Bahmai-ye Garmsiri-ye Jonubi Rural District, in the Central District of Bahmai County, Kohgiluyeh and Boyer-Ahmad Province, Iran. At the 2006 census, its population was 413, in 80 families.

References 

Populated places in Bahmai County